

Northern Transvaal results in the 1995 Currie cup

 Northern Transvaal did not qualify for the 1995 Currie Cup final.

Statistics

1995 Currie cup log position

1988 - 1995 results summary (including play off matches)

Northern Transvaal
1995